Carlos Alfredo Rodríguez is an Argentine international academic and economist member of Chicago school.

Early career
Rodriguez obtained his undergraduate degree in Economics from the University of Buenos Aires in 1969, and the Ph.D. in Economics from The University of Chicago in 1973. Between 1973 and 1978, he taught at Columbia University in New York. 

In 1979, he returned to Argentina and joined Center of Argentine Macroeconomic Studies.

International role
He has been visiting professor at the University of Chicago, Princeton University and the University of Montevideo, as well as consultant  and visiting scholar at the World Bank, the Agency for International Development (AID), and the International Monetary Fund. As an international consultant he has participated in missions in almost all countries in Latin America as well as Poland, Czechoslovakia, the ex-USSR and Romania. In 1987, he was designated member of the Argentine Academy of Economic Sciences. Between 1996 and 1998, he was vice-minister of economics and secretary for economic policy of Argentina. In 1994, he was the founding president of the Universidad del CEMA (Rector), a position he holds until 2018. At UCEMA, he was also director of the Ph.D. program in economics, and professor of international monetary economics.

Publications
He has published more than 60 papers in international journals, including Econometrica, American Economic Review and the Journal of Political Economy. His main research fields are Macroeconomics and International Economics.  Other academic activities include: Member of the Editorial Board of the World Bank Economic Review(1988-90), founding Editor of the Journal of Applied Economics (1998-2008), Guggenheim Fellow (1983-84), and Director of the Center of Applied Economics at UCEMA.

See also
Chicago School of Economics

External links
 Personal Web Page:
 Carlos Alfredo Rodríguez at IDEAS

1947 births
Living people
International economists
Argentine economists
Conservatism in Argentina
Peronists